Madkyu Khola Hydropower Station (Nepali:मड्क्यु खोला जलविद्युत आयोजना) is a run-of-river hydro-electric plant located in   Kaski District of Nepal. The flow from Madkyu River is used to generate 13 MW electricity. 

The plant is owned and developed by Silkes Hydropower Pvt.Ltd, an IPP of Nepal. The plant started generating electricity from 2074-12-19BS. The generation licence will expire in 2105-11-20 BS, after which the plant will be handed over to the government.  The power station was connected to the national grid in 2018  and the electricity is sold to Nepal Electricity Authority.

See also

List of power stations in Nepal

References

Hydroelectric power stations in Nepal
Gravity dams
Run-of-the-river power stations
Dams in Nepal
Irrigation in Nepal
Buildings and structures in Kaski District